

Arthropods

Insects

Dinosaurs

Plesiosaurs

New taxa

Pterosaurs

New taxa

Paleontologists
 Death of German Paleontologist Christian Hermann Erich von Meyer.

References

1860s in paleontology
Paleontology
Paleontology 9
Paleontology, 1869 In